Mariza Marchetti Salvi (born 25 November 1982) is a Brazilian actress.

Early life and education
Mariza Marchetti was born on 25 November 1982 in São Paulo.

Mariza studied at Colégio Rio Branco in Higienópolis. In 1998, she entered law school at Universidade Paulista (UNIP), graduating in 2002. In the same year she graduated, she took a scenic arts course at Incenna Escola de Teatro e Televisão.

Career 
In 1998 Mariza had her first TV experience narrating the pilot episode of the series Mulher. In 2000, she debuted as an actress in the miniseries Tele-tema, from the assigned channel TVC Rio, playing as the student Carla. In 2002, she was in the soap opera Marisol as Raquel, secretary of the main character, in addition to participating in the documentary Raul Roulien, um Brasileiro em Hollywood. In the following years, she made special appearances in the soap operas Seus Olhos and Revelação, in addition to being in the short films Nostra Bella Época, Além de Dois, Vida a Três and Noturno. In 2009, she signed with the portal Spetáculos and had her first experience with the internet starring in the web-novel Vento Norte as the suffering Raíssa, moving in the same year to the position of antagonist in Black Tie, as the ambitious Micaella L'faire. In 2012 she was in the cast of Máscaras, from Rede Record, playing as the gynecologist Paula Aguillar.

In 2013, she joined the cast of Flor do Caribe, from Rede Globo, as the doctor Márcia, who maintained an NGO to treat children and adolescents who suffered sexual exploitation. In 2016 she got the opportunity to play her first prominent role, Lady Rebeca in Escrava Mãe, an abolitionist who fought for the emancipation of women. In 2017 she played Malca in O Rico e Lázaro.

Filmography 
NOTE: The names of the films and the roles played are in Portuguese. See the original Wikipedia page here.

Television

Web

Film

Theater 
NOTE: The names of the films and the roles played are in Portuguese.

References

External links 
Official website (in Portuguese)

1982 births
Living people